Kjell-Olof Feldt (born 18 August 1931) is a Swedish Social Democratic politician who was minister of finance between 1983 and 1990. Previously, Feldt was assistant minister of finance from 1975 to 1976 and minister of commerce and industry from 1970 to 1975 as well as minister for the budget in 1982. The Social Democrats lost power in the 1976 elections, but, after having won the elections of 1982, Feldt was appointed minister of finance by Prime Minister Olof Palme. He was seen as a part of Kanslihushögern during his time in office.

Early life
Feldt was the son of a single mother, Irma, née Jonsson, who had to send young Kjell-Olof to live with his grandfather's sister because of his father's alcoholic problems. Though he came from a working-class family, Kjell-Olof managed to gain admission to Uppsala University where he received a Politices Magister (extended BA in political science) degree in 1956. He received a Master's degree at Lund University in 1967.

Career
In a Playboy Scandinavia interview, Feldt reminisced upon his own legacy within the Social Democratic Party,

"The negative inheritance I received from my predecessor Gunnar Sträng (minister of finance 1955–1976) was a strongly progressive tax system with high marginal taxes. This was supposed to bring about a just and equal society. But I eventually came to the opinion that it simply didn't work out that way he concluded. Progressive taxes created instead a society of wranglers, cheaters, peculiar manipulations, false ambitions and new injustices. It took me at least a decade to get a part of the party to see this."

In the late 1980s Feldt and was heavily criticised from within his own party: he and others at the Ministry of Finance Sw. "kanslihushögern" were perceived to be promoting right-wing politics and to be failing to live up to the traditional ideals of the social democrats. When economic problems mounted in 1990, the rift was highlighted, and Feldt left office after a fall-out with Prime Minister Ingvar Carlsson on 16 February. Feldt had been in favour of a more conservative economic policy in response to the crisis, and when his ideas met resistance, he decided to leave his office. Feldt subsequently left party politics, though he remains a member of the Social Democratic Party. During the 1990s and early 2000s, Feldt has heavily criticised Social Democratic economic policy, both past and present.

Personal life
Since 1970, he has been married to Birgitta von Otter. On 31 May 1991 he received an honorary doctorate from the Faculty of Social Sciences at Uppsala University.

References

1931 births
Living people
Swedish Social Democratic Party politicians
Swedish Ministers for Finance
People from Västerbotten County
Swedish Ministers for Nordic Cooperation
Economy ministers of Sweden
Swedish Ministers for the Budget